Kurup of Travancore (alternatively Guyrip, Kuruppu or Kuruppanmar) was a sub caste / title used by Nairs in the Kingdom of Travancore who held Naduvazhi status.They belong to the Nair caste. There is also a category of warriors among them(padakuruppu). These were mainly soldiers. Illath Nayar are generally had the title Kurup attached to their name.

References

Kingdom of Travancore